Mighty Switch Force! is a puzzle-platform game developed by WayForward Technologies for Nintendo 3DS. It is the third game in WayForward's Mighty series, following Mighty Flip Champs! and Mighty Milky Way. The game was released on the Nintendo eShop on December 22, 2011. An update to the game, including five new levels, was released on May 24, 2012. A high-definition version, Mighty Switch Force! Hyper Drive Edition, was released for the Wii U in 2012, featuring re-drawn graphics and other new features. A Steam version of the game was also released in June 2015. A sequel, Mighty Switch Force! 2, was released in June 2013.

Plot
A group of convicts called the "Hooligan Sisters" escape custody on Planet Land. As they escape, one of them breaks open a canister, which causes Planet Land to become infested with monsters. The "Galactic Penal Squad" contact "cybernetic peace officer" Patricia Wagon (voiced by Stephanie Komure), authorizing the use of her Siren Helmet and Pellet Shooter, in order to capture the criminals. Helping her along the way are General Gendarmor, a mechanical armor that can extract her from battles, Ugly Twitching Dog (U.T.D), who can create reload points, and HQ, who are monitoring her actions.

Gameplay
The player controls a cyborg police officer named Patricia Wagon, who has to round up a group of escaped female convicts. The goal of each level is to find all the escaped convicts and return to the exit point as quickly as possible, with each level possessing a Par Time that dedicated speed runners can try and beat. Along with the ability to jump and shoot, Patricia has the ability to push in and out blocks dotted around the stage with her "Siren Helmet", using them as platforms or a means to destroy certain enemies. There are also various other types of blocks such as launcher blocks that send Patricia or an enemy in a certain direction and colored blocks that allow the player to change which plane they switch on. During each level, the player has three hearts (called her "Heart Drive", in universe), with the player losing one heart if Patricia is hurt by an enemy, comes into contact with spikes or is pushed into the screen by a block change (Checkpoints created allow Patricia to respawn at that point in the case of the latter two). If Patricia loses all three hearts, she will have to start the level over. Throughout the level she can collect floppy disks which restore hearts, either by finding them, or from shooting enemies.

Development
The game was released for the Nintendo eShop on December 22, 2011. A free update to the game was released on May 24, 2012, featuring five new levels, improved 3D effect and the option to restart the level. On July 3, 2012, WayForward announced development of Mighty Switch Force! Hyper Drive Edition as a downloadable title for the Wii U. The game features redrawn graphics similar in style to A Boy and His Blob, and also features off-screen game play with the Wii U GamePad, as well as the downloadable content from the Nintendo 3DS update. New to this version of the game is also the inclusion of Hyper Mode levels, which remaster all previous levels making them even harder. The game was released in conjunction with Wii U's American launch November 18, 2012. In Europe, the game was released December 6, 2012.

Reception

The game received "favorable" reviews on all platforms according to the review aggregation website Metacritic. IGN praised the 3DS version's gameplay and presentation but criticized its short length.

Legacy
A sequel, Mighty Switch Force! 2, which has a focus on firefighting, was released for Nintendo 3DS in June 2013. This was followed by a puzzle game spin-off title, Mighty Switch Force! Hose It Down! A third game, Mighty Switch Force! Academy, was released in November 2015 for PC and features multiplayer elements. A downloadable content pack for Shantae: Half-Genie Hero adds an additional story campaign featuring character costumes and gameplay mechanics from Mighty Switch Force. A collection titled Mighty Switch Force! Collection, which includes Mighty Switch Force!, Mighty Switch Force! 2, Mighty Switch Force! Hyper Drive Edition and Mighty Switch Force! Academy was released for Microsoft Windows, Nintendo Switch, PlayStation 4 and Xbox One on July 25, 2019, and for Amazon Luna on November 24, 2020.

References

External links
 Official site for Mighty Switch Force!
 Official site for Mighty Switch Force! Hyper Drive Edition
 
 

2011 video games
Nintendo 3DS eShop games
Puzzle video games
Platform games
Video games scored by Jake Kaufman
Video games developed in the United States
Video games featuring female protagonists
Video games about police officers
WayForward games
Wii U eShop games
Windows games
Single-player video games